The 1974 NCAA Division I Men's Cross Country Championships were the 36th annual cross country meet to determine the team and individual national champions of NCAA Division I men's collegiate cross country running in the United States. Held on November 26, 1974, the meet was hosted by Indiana University at the IU Cross Country Course in Bloomington, Indiana. The distance for this race was 6 miles (9.7 kilometers).

All Division I members were eligible to qualify for the meet. In total, 28 teams and 250 individual runners contested this championship.

The team national championship was retained by the Oregon Ducks, their third overall, and second consecutive, title. The individual championship was won by Nick Rose, from Western Kentucky, with a time of 29:22.00.

Men's title
Distance: 6 miles (9.7 kilometers)

Team Result (Top 10)

See also
NCAA Men's Division II Cross Country Championship 
NCAA Men's Division III Cross Country Championship

References
 

NCAA Cross Country Championships
NCAA Division I Cross Country Championships
NCAA Division I Cross Country Championships
Bloomington, Indiana
Track and field in Indiana
NCAA Division I Cross Country Championships
Indiana University